Andrew Webster (born 18 March 1947) is an English former professional footballer who played as a centre forward.

Career
Born in Colne, Webster spent his early career with Rolls-Royce, Burnley, Colne Dynamoes and Clitheroe. He signed for Bradford City from Clitheroe in August 1964. He made 12 league and 2 Football League Cup appearances for the club, before being released in 1967.

Sources

References

1947 births
Living people
English footballers
Burnley F.C. players
Colne Dynamoes F.C. players
Clitheroe F.C. players
Bradford City A.F.C. players
English Football League players
Association football forwards